The Synagogue in the Slovak town of Vrbové was erected in 1883. It is a protected cultural monument.

History
A Jewish community in Vrbové is known since at least 1522. At the 1880 census the 1303 Jews comprised 28% of the town's population.

The present building of the former synagogue was erected in 1883 at Beňovského Street, the main street of the town.

In the late 1980s the town's authority started the restoration with the aim to use the building for cultural purposes, and two facades were given a respectable appearance. But after the political changes of 1989 half of the property was given to the individuals who owned the building shortly after WW II and the work stopped.

Architecture
The synagogue has a three-partite front in the Moorish style and is decorated with horizontal red-yellow stripes, octagonal stars and slim minaretes. The door and windows are built in the Rundbogenstil. On top of the central part between two of the minarets are the Tablets of Law.

The interior is only partially preserved; the women's gallery, supported by cast-iron columns, is without railings and the furnishing has disappeared.

The ceiling is covered by lively geometric and floral motifs.

External links

References

Synagogues in Slovakia
19th-century architecture in Slovakia
Synagogues completed in 1883
Moorish Revival synagogues
Rundbogenstil synagogues